Let's Live for Today may refer to:

Let's Live for Today (album), a 1967 album by The Grass Roots
"Let's Live for Today" (song), a 1967 song by The Grass Roots from the album of the same name